Jingxing may refer to the following of China:

Hebei
Jingxing County (井陉县), of Shijiazhuang, Hebei
Jingxing Mining District (井陉矿区), Shijiazhuang, Hebei
Jingxing Pass (井陉关), a mountain pass of the Taihang Mountains

Others
Chen Jingxing (陳景星), an Qing Dynasty official from Fujian, born in 1807
Jingxing, Longjiang County (景星镇), town in Heilongjiang